Mezhurki is a rural locality (a settlement) in Azletskoye Rural Settlement, Kharovsky District, Vologda Oblast, Russia. The population was 85 as of 2010. There are 5 streets.

Geography 
Mezhurki is located 74 km northwest of Kharovsk (the district's administrative centre) by road. Ploskovo is the nearest rural locality.

References 

Rural localities in Kharovsky District